Philippe Battaglia (born 12 September 1958) competed in the 1988 Olympic Games in sailing for Monaco.

Career 

Battaglia finished 30th in the Finn class at the 1988 Olympic Games. Along with David Lajoux he finished 78th in the 1998 Star World Championships and 91st in the 1999 Star World Championships.

Personal life 

Battaglia's father Gérard and cousin René both represented Monaco in the Olympic Games.

References 

1958 births
Olympic sailors of Monaco
Sailors at the 1988 Summer Olympics – Finn
Living people
Monegasque male sailors (sport)